Terran (Last Gun) (born 1989 in Browning, Montana) is an American visual artist. He is a citizen of the Piikani Nation of Montana, a member of the Siksikaitsitapii (Blackfoot Confederacy). He lives and works in Santa Fe, New Mexico.

Early life
Last Gun is a Piikani Blackfoot citizen, born in Browning, Montana; he grew up on the Piikani Reservation. Last Gun's father is an artist and historian for his tribe who encouraged his son to pursue a degree in museum studies at the Institute of American Indian Arts. Last Gun was raised Catholic but did not understand nor feel a part of that faith. Beginning in the 4th grade, he attended the Lost Children immersion school which was on the Piikani Reservation. The school was founded in part by Darrell Robes Kipp, who is Last Gun's great uncle.

Education
In 2011, Last Gun received an A.S. degree in Environmental Science from Blackfeet Community College, Browning, Montana, and went on to receive a Bachelor of Fine Arts in Museum Studies as well as an Associate of Fine Arts in Studio Arts in 2016 from the Institute of American Indian Arts in Santa Fe, New Mexico.

Work
Last Gun primarily works in serigraphy, painting, ledger drawing and photography. His work interprets cultural narratives of nature and the cosmos, connecting the ancient world to contemporary realms. Last Gun states, "I am revealing fragments of time, history, and Indigenous Abstraction — an art form that has continued for tens of thousands of years." Last Gun has stated that the painted lodges of the Blackfeet are a source of inspiration that he draws on in his work. The imagery used in the painted lodges has been passed down through generations. These designs have three zones: the upper sky world, the middle zone representing the animal spirit helpers, and the lower zone of Earth.

In 2018, Last Gun had a solo show at the Institute of American Indian Arts; in 2020 he had a solo show, Terran Last Gun: Color Play at the Museum of Contemporary Native Arts, Santa Fe and has had two solo shows, in 2019 and 2020, at Hecho a Mano Gallery, Santa Fe. In 2021, he had a one-person show at Blue Star Contemporary, San Antonio, Texas. His work has been included in group exhibitions at the Rainmaker Gallery in Bristol, UK, SITE Santa Fe and the Santa Fe Institute, among other venues.

Awards and honors
In 2020 Last Gun received a fellowship from the First People's Fund as an "Artist in Business Leadership", and a Story Maps fellowship from the Santa Fe Art Institute.

In 2016 he received a Goodman Aspiring Artist fellowship from the Museum of Indian Arts and Culture. In 2017 he was an artist-in-residence at the IAIA Museum of Contemporary Art.

Collections
 IAIA Museum of Contemporary Native Arts, Santa Fe, NM
 Institute of American Indian Arts, Public Art Collection, Santa Fe, NM
 Ralph T. Coe Center for the Arts, Santa Fe, NM
 The Heritage Center at Red Cloud Indian School, Pine Ridge, SD

References

Further reading
 Sarah Elisabeth Sawyer, Bold Color and Shape by a Contemporary Piikani Artist, First Peoples Fund

External links
 Engaging the Future with Terran Last Gun (Piikani), Museum of American Indian Arts and Culture
 Terran Last Gun Story Maps Fellow
 Terran Last Gun on Instagram

Native American artists
21st-century American artists
Printmakers
Piikani Nation people